The otter is a fishing device constructed with two parts. An otter board and a fishing line. It is steered by pulling on the line then letting stack so the slide mechanism on the board operates to switch direction. It may be used from a boat or pulled from the shore. It is very difficult to retrieve from a boat once fish are on. The board steers away from shore when the line is pulled and positioned by giving more or less line out. The board will travel parallel to the line of travel of the fisherman. It was introduced into Norway by British anglers sometime around the middle of the nineteenth century. The first account of such a device is found in connection with irish sports fishermen in 1855.

The otter may have multiple different designs. Otter boards used in bottom trawling are based on a similar principle of design. The design takes advantage of the shearing effect achieved when the board is positioned at an oblique angle to the current. The effect is reminiscent of that of a kite in the wind. Different designs are found in Switzerland, the nordic countries, California and Japan. Most commonly the traditional board was made by wood, and had a length about two feet, a width of 6 inches and less than an inch thick. To enable it to float in an upright position it was equipped with metal weights made of lead or iron. The correct amount of weights allows the board to float with only an inch or two above the surface. Snells, bated with flies or spoons are placed at intervals along the line. The snells would have different lengths due to the height above the water of the line along its length. An inch adjacent to the board and hip height adjacent to the fisherman. the longest snell would have been closest to the fisherman and the shortest closest to the board. In Britain fishing with an otter was forbidden by the Salmon Fishery Act 1861, and this may have been one of the reasons why British anglers introduced it to Norway. The first ban on the device in Norway was imposed in 1870 an it was increasingly forbidden throughout the end of the century.

References 

Fishing equipment